Pietro Giacomo Porcelli (30 January 1872 – 28 June 1943) was an Italian-born sculptor responsible for many statues in Western Australia, including the Explorers' Monument, and those of C. Y. O'Connor and Alexander Forrest.

Biography
Born in Bisceglie in the province of Bari, he moved to Sydney with his fisherman father at the age of 8. After initial training at the New South Wales Academy of Art, he furthered his study of sculpture and drawing in Naples, before returning to Fremantle with his father in 1898. Later that year, he completed his first commission – a bust of Sir John Forrest that now stands in the main entrance hall of Parliament House in Perth. His 1902 statue of Alexander Forrest was the first such statue of a prominent public figure to be completed in Perth. He also created the imposing figure which stood atop the seven-storey AMP Chambers at the corner of St George's Tce and William St, which was completed in 1915, but demolished in 1972.

Porcelli also completed war memorials in Kalgoorlie, Boulder, Victoria Park, West Leederville and Moora, and numerous headstones in Karrakatta and Fremantle Cemeteries, including that of Sir John Forrest in 1918.

After a period of work in Melbourne in the 1920s, he returned to Perth in 1939, where he died in 1943. He is buried in Karrakatta Cemetery.

Major works

References

1872 births
1943 deaths
20th-century Australian sculptors
Burials at Karrakatta Cemetery
Artists from Perth, Western Australia
People from the Province of Barletta-Andria-Trani
Italian emigrants to Australia
19th-century Australian sculptors